Plourde is a surname. Notable people with the surname include:
André Plourde (born 1937), Canadian politician
Derrick Plourde (1971– 2005), American drummer
Joseph-Aurèle Plourde (1915–2013), Canadian Roman Catholic archbishop
Lucien Plourde (born 1930), Canadian politician
Marie Plourde (born 1966), Canadian politician
Tony Plourde (born 1966), Canadian fencer
Peter Plourde (born 1977), American rapper (Professor Lyrical) and University Professor